The 1967–68 SK Rapid Wien season was the 70th season in club history.

Squad

Squad and statistics

Squad statistics

Fixtures and results

League

Cup

European Cup

References

1967-68 Rapid Wien Season
Rapid
Austrian football championship-winning seasons